Freedom Township may refer to one of the following places in the State of Illinois:

 Freedom Township, Carroll County, Illinois
 Freedom Township, LaSalle County, Illinois

See also

Freedom Township (disambiguation)

Illinois township disambiguation pages